The KFC Twenty20 Big Bash was a domestic Twenty20 cricket competition in Australia. The competition was organised by Cricket Australia, and sponsored by fast food chicken outlet KFC. The competition was replaced by the Big Bash League as Australia's domestic Twenty20 competition after the 2010–11 tournament. The Victorian Bushrangers were the most successful team during the tournament's running, winning the title four times.

Teams

Placings

Finals

Records
Highest Score: 7/233 Victorian Bushrangers vs New South Wales Blues, 21 Jan 2006, at North Sydney Oval.
Lowest Score: 71 (16.2 overs) New South Wales, vs Western Warriors, 5 Jan 2010, at WACA Ground.
Biggest Winning Margin: 127 Western Warriors vs New South Wales Blues, 5 Jan 2010, at WACA Ground.
Lowest Winning Margin: 2 Victorian Bushrangers vs Western Warriors, 6 Jan 2006, at WACA Ground, Perth. New South Wales Blues vs Victorian Bushrangers, 17 Jan 2009, at ANZ Stadium, Sydney.
Highest Individual Score: 111 (56 balls) Michael Dighton, Tasmanian Tigers vs New South Wales Blues, 10 Jan 2007, at ANZ Stadium, Sydney.
Most Runs: See Infobox.
Fastest Half-Century: 18 Balls David Warner, New South Wales Blues vs Tasmanian Tigers, 30 Dec 2009 Bellerive Oval, Hobart
Best Bowling: 6/25 (3 overs) Michael Dighton, Tasmanian Tigers vs Queensland Bulls, 1 Jan 2007, at The Heritage Oval, Toowoomba.
Most Wickets: See Infobox.
Most Catches: 13 David Hussey, Victorian Bushrangers.
Largest Crowd: 43,125 – Victorian Bushrangers vs Tasmanian Tigers, 15 Jan 2010 at the Melbourne Cricket Ground.

Television coverage
All games, including the finals were covered by Fox Sports.

References

External links
 Cricinfo Australian Domestic Cricket Archive

Big Bash League
2005 establishments in Australia
Sports leagues established in 2005
Australian domestic cricket competitions
Defunct professional sports leagues in Australia
Twenty20 cricket leagues
KFC
Recurring events disestablished in 2011
Recurring sporting events established in 2005
Defunct cricket leagues